HMS Morne Fortunee was a French privateer captured in 1808 and taken into Royal Navy service. She participated in the capture of Guadeloupe in 1810 before she was broken up at Antigua in October 1813.

Capture
In August 1808  captured the French privateer Joséphine, which the Royal Navy took into service as Morne Fortunee.

Royal Navy
By one report Lieutenant John James Rorie commissioned her in 1808. However, that may simply reflect confusion with his being in command of her predecessor,  for a period during the year; that Morne Fortunee was not lost until January 1809.

In 1809 Morne Fortunee was under the command of Lieutenant Willis (or Wills). He commanded her when she participated in the capture of Guadeloupe in January–February 1810. She was among the vessels for which in 1847 the Admiralty awarded the NGSM with clasp "Guadaloupe".

In 1810 Lieutenant Wells replaced Willis. Lieutenant Joseph Steele replaced Wells in 1811.

Citations

References
 
 

1800s ships
Privateer ships of France
Captured ships
Brigs of the Royal Navy